Toéssin may refer to:

Toéssin, Mogtédo, Burkina Faso
Toéssin, Zoungou, Burkina Faso
Toéssin, Rollo, Burkina Faso
Toéssin, Zimtenga, Burkina Faso